Taste receptor type 2 member 5 is a protein that in humans is encoded by the TAS2R5 gene.

Function 

This gene encodes a bitter taste receptor; bitter taste receptors are members of the G protein-coupled receptor superfamily and are specifically expressed by taste receptor cells of the tongue and palate epithelia. Each of these apparently intronless taste receptor genes encodes a 7-transmembrane receptor protein, functioning as a bitter taste receptor. This gene is clustered with another 3 candidate taste receptor genes on chromosome 7 and is genetically linked to loci that influence bitter perception.

See also
 Taste receptor

References

Further reading

Human taste receptors